Free association, also known as free association of producers, is a relationship among individuals where there is no state, social class, hierarchy, or private ownership of means of production. Once private property is abolished (distinctly not personal property), individuals are no longer deprived of access to means of production, thus enabling them to freely associate without social constraint to produce and reproduce their own conditions of existence and fulfill their individual and creative needs and desires. The term is used by anarchists and Marxists and is often considered a defining feature of a fully developed communist society.

Anarchism 

Anarchists argue that the free association must rise immediately in the struggle of the proletariat for a new society and against the ruling class. They promote a social revolution to immediately abolish the state, private property and classes. They identify the state as the main guarantor of private property through the repressive apparatus such as the police or courts, hence the abolition of the state is their main target. Regarding free association, there is a difference between collectivist anarchists and anarcho-communists. The collectivist anarchists (such as Mikhail Bakunin) argued that free association is to function as the maxim "From each according to his ability, to each according to his deeds". In contraposition, the anarcho-communists (such as Peter Kropotkin, Carlo Cafiero and Errico Malatesta) argue that free association should operate as the maxim "to each according to his needs". Anarcho-communists argue that remuneration according to work performed require that the individuals involved were subjected to a body above them to compare the various works in order to pay them and that this body would necessarily be a state or ruling class and could even bring back wage slavery, the very thing against which anarchists are fighting. They also argue that if any work is done, it is necessary and important that there is no quantitative aspect to comparate between them and that everything that is produced involves something essential to the contribution of all past and contemporary generations as a whole. There are no fair criteria to compare one work with another and measure it to give all individuals their share. For the anarcho-communists, free association is possible only through the abolition of money and the market, along with the abolition of the state.

The anarchist concept of free association is often considered by critics to be utopian or too abstract to guide a transforming society.

Marxism 

The Marxian socialists and communists generally differ from anarchists in claiming that there must be an intermediate stage between the capitalist society and free association. However, there are major differences between the various Marxists trends. The Marxist position about this transition period ranged from "the expansion of the means of production owned by the state" to the clear statement that the state machinery can not be assumed by the workers, but destroyed.

Libertarian Marxists (such as Anton Pannekoek, Otto Rühle, Herman Gorter) generally claim that the state can not be directed towards the free association because it can only act within the frame of capitalist society itself, leading towards state capitalism (i.e. capitalism in which private property is owned and managed by the state) which would seek to remain indefinitely and never lead to free association. Most libertarian Marxists claim that free association can only be achieved through the direct action of workers themselves, who should create workers' councils which operate under direct democracy to take the means of production and abolish the state in a social revolution. However, Luxemburgists are not opposed in principle to short-term participation within the state and expansion of public-ownership as long as the institution itself exists.

Socialism 
Socialists consider a free association the defining feature of developed socialism. A free association would displace the state apparatus in socialism as the role of this association would be to direct the processes of production and the administration of things. This is in contrast to the state in non-socialist and capitalist society, which is the government over people via coercive action. The free association represents a coordinating entity for economic activity that is concerned with administrative decision-making and the flow of goods and services to satisfy demand.

Literature 
Since anarchists, some libertarian Marxists (such as the Situationists) and other libertarian socialists consider free association as an immediate task for introduction and maintenance of stateless socialism, most theorists have gone into great detail about how it will operate. This is unlike most Bolsheviks, who tend to be more concerned with the transition than the final goal. Some of the most important works include:
 The Humanisphere: Anarchist Utopia (L'Humanisphère: Utopie anarchique, 1857) by the libertarian communist Joseph Déjacque.
 The Conquest of Bread (1892) by anarcho-communist Peter Kropotkin.
 New Babylon (1963) by Situationist Constant Nieuwenhuys.
 A World Without Money: Communism (1975–1976) by the French group Friends of 4 Millions of Young Workers.
 Bolo'bolo (1983) by anarchist P.M.
 The Thin Red Line: Non-market Socialism in the Twentieth Century (1987) by John Crump which offers an account of the ideas of several trends which considered important the free association.

Quotations

See also 

 Cooperative
 Economic freedom
 Freedom of association
 Self-governance
 Workers' self-management
 Workplace democracy

References 

Anarchist theory
Anarcho-communism
Anti-capitalism
Anti-fascism
Marxist theory
Political philosophy
Communism
Socialism